= Mi Lu =

American engineer and professor

Mi Lu is an engineer and professor of Electrical and Computer Engineering. She is noted for her contributions in computer arithmetic, parallel algorithms, computer architectures, and computer networks. She has been with the Department of Electrical and Computer Engineering in Texas A&M University since 1987. She is the author of the book Arithmetic and Logic in Computer Systems and book chapters in Handbook of Bioinspired Algorithms and Applications and Biocomputing.

== Education and career ==
Lu received her MS and PhD degrees in electrical engineering from Rice University, Houston in 1984 and 1987, respectively. She joined the Department of Electrical and Computer Engineering in Texas A&M University, where she was an assistant professor 1987–93, associate professor 1993-98 and professor 1998 – present.

== Activity ==
Lu is the Chair of Technical Program Committee, International Conference on Foundations Computer Science and Software Engineering, 2021, Conference Chairman, International Conference on Computer Science and Informatics, 2003, 2002 and 2000, General Chair, International Conference on Control Engineering and Mechanical Design, 2017, and co-chair, the Annual International Conference on Computer Science and Mechanical Automation, 2017.

Lu has been Guest Editor, Honorable Editor, Topics Editor, and on editorial boards of professional journals including the IEEE Transactions on ITS. She served on the review panel of the National Science Foundation. She has been the chair of 51 research advisory committees for PhD, Masters students and post doctors.

== Recognition ==
Lu was a selected Who's Who of Professional Women. She has been recognized in Who's Who in America, Who's Who in the World, Who's Who of American Women, Who's Who in Science and Engineering, and Who's Who in American Education. Lu is the recipient of the Innovative Paper Award, CSCI 2019. She was named Webb Faculty Fellow, Dwight Look College of Engineering, Texas A&M University, 2002-2003
